Herbert Wassell Nadal (November 29, 1873 - January 27, 1957) was a minstrel show performer on the vaudeville circuit.

Biography
He was born on November 29, 1873 in Louisville, Kentucky to Bernard William Nadal and Josephine Olmstead. He married Bessie K. Woodhead (1881-1932) around 1900 and they had as their child, Bernard W. Nadal (1902-1978).

He performed minstrel with Charley Willinghurst as the vaudeville team of Herbert & Willing on the B. F. Keith Circuit. The performed with Will Rogers, and Fanny Brice. Their routines included "My Darling Ducky-Wucky Honey Lamb" and "The Girl With the Ragtime Walk". He later owned theaters in Louisville, Kentucky.

He died in Louisville, Kentucky on January 27, 1957.

References

1873 births
1957 deaths
Vaudeville performers
Blackface minstrel performers
People from Louisville, Kentucky